Khapse (from Tibetan: ཁ་ཟས་) or colloquially known as amjok (from Tibetan ཨམ་བྱོག་ (Ear)) is a Tibetan biscuit that is traditionally prepared during the Tibetan New Year or Losar. The dough for the khapse is usually made with flour, eggs, butter and sugar and is then shaped into different shapes and sizes.

See also
 List of Tibetan dishes
 Sangha Bhaley
 Thenshi bhatuk

References

Tibetan cuisine
Biscuits